() is derived from the word  which means 'excited, enthusiastic or inspired, seer, domestic priest, learned, wise, poet or a learned theologian or theologist.'
 
In the context of Hindu philosophy, this term occurs very significantly in the second  (verse) of Sri Shankara’s Vivekachudamani which  reads as follows:

The purport of this statement is that all three twice-born castes are qualified to study the Vedas but attaining the status of  – that of being aBrāhmana – is very rare. Whereas a Kshatriya engages himself mostly in ruling over his kingdom and a Vaishya, in trade, etc., the person of a Brāhmana, because it is not intended for enjoying sense-pleasures, must be subjected to strict disciplines in preparation of enjoying eternal joy in store after death, the ultimate  which is the dharma only of Brāhmaņas. Through a Sanskrit inscription, written in late Brahmi script, found on the Talagunda Stone-pillar in Shimoga district dated 455-470 A.D; it became known that a Kadamba king named Śāntivarman had saved the Brahmanahood in the Kali Yuga. In his commentary on the Aitareya Upanishad (Sloka III.ii.3), Shankara states that the Atman is expanded only in human beings who are therefore endowed with intelligence; who see what is known, give expression to what is known and know what is to come; they know the visible and the invisible and perceive the immortal through the mortal. Thus, according to Shankara, the individual self is conscious living entity that makes the individual body eligible for action and knowledge. Accordingly, the term , here, refers to the inwardly inspired or awakened body and mind; it does not refer to persons born in the families of Brahmins as has been erroneously interpreted by the orthodox interpreters.

And, this means that mere  (birth as a brahmin) by itself will not help to attain what is to be attained, and vide Jaimini Dharma, which is super-sensuous and the very foundation of universe, is what is commanded by the Vedas. The phrase  refers to the discrimination between the Atman and whatever is not the Atman, that is, to the Anatman, which reflection produces firm conviction of the truth of the śrutis supported by reasoning.

 by Sanātana Goswami states that , i.e. the status of the twice-born, can be gained by being properly initiated. In this context, Kāne states that:

""

References

Vedanta